A dienone is a class of organic compounds that are formally "derived from diene compounds by conversion of a –CH2– groups into –C(=O)– group .", resulting in "a conjugated structure". The class includes some heterocyclic compounds.

Properties

Rearrangement reaction of 6-membered cyclic dienones generate phenols through the dienone–phenol rearrangement:

See also 
 Quinone
 Dione
 Penguinone
 Cyclopentadienone
 Tropone
 Enone

References 

Enones